Blake Richards  (born November 8, 1974) is a Canadian politician. He has been a Conservative Member of Parliament since 2008, having been elected to represent the now defunct electoral district (or riding) of Wild Rose in the October 14, 2008 and May 2, 2011 federal elections and subsequently the riding of Banff—Airdrie in federal elections held on October 19, 2015, October 21, 2019, and September 20, 2021.

Early life and career
Richards was born in Olds, Alberta. Prior to starting his real estate business, Richards worked in the oil field and agriculture-related industries, and attended Red Deer College and the University of Calgary, where he earned a degree in political science.

He served his community as a volunteer firefighter and minor hockey coach before being elected to the House of Commons in 2008.

Federal politics
Richards was elected in the 2008 federal election and re-elected in the 2011, 2015, 2019, and 2021 federal elections.

Richards is the Chief Opposition Whip. He previously served as Official Opposition Shadow Minister for Small Business, Export Promotion and Tourism. In the 41st Parliament, Richards chaired the Parliamentary Tourism Caucus and the House of Commons' Standing Committee on Aboriginal Affairs and Northern Development and the Special Committee on Co-operatives. He has also been a member of the committees on Finance; International Trade; Public Safety and National Security; Procedure and House Affairs; Canadian Heritage; Agriculture; and Transport, Infrastructure and Communities.

Through the Rocky Mountain Hockey Challenge, Richards has raised $360,000 for regional groups that assist victims of crime.

In 2010, Richards spearheaded a national petition that called for changes to the national pardons system after it was revealed that convicted sex offender Graham James had received a pardon in 2007 for his offences. The petition attracted thousands of supporters from across Canada and in June 2010, Bill C-23A, an act to limit pardons for serious crimes, received Royal Assent.

In October 2011, Richards introduced Private Member's Bill C-309 in the House of Commons. It received Royal Assent in June 2013. As a result, it is now an offence under the Criminal Code of Canada to wear a mask or to otherwise conceal one's identity during a riot or an unlawful assembly.

On November 30, 2017, House of Commons Speaker Geoff Regan ordered that Richards be removed from the House for "excessive heckling" following three repeated warnings.

Richards has three times been recognized as the Hardest Working and Best Constituency MP in The Hill Times Annual Politically Savvy Survey and has been recognized with a Canadian Tourism Award for his work in Parliament on behalf of the tourism industry.

Electoral record

References

External links
Blake Richards

1974 births
Canadian firefighters
Canadian real estate agents
Conservative Party of Canada MPs
Living people
Members of the House of Commons of Canada from Alberta
People from Airdrie, Alberta
People from Olds, Alberta
University of Calgary alumni
21st-century Canadian politicians